The Kafue Gorge Upper Power Station (KGU), is an operational  hydroelectric power plant across the Kafue River in Zambia.

Location
The geographical coordinates of Kafue Gorge Upper Power Station are:15°48'25.0"S, 28°25'16.0"E (Latitude:-15.806944; Longitude:28.421111).

Overview
KGU is an earth-rockfill dam with a concrete spillway with four radial gates. The electromechanical capacity is six generators of 150 megawatts each, for maximum capacity of 900 megawatts. The reservoir measures  in surface area. The power generators and electromechanical power house are below ground. The water effluent from 900 megawatts Kafue Gorge Upper Power Station is used downstream to power the 750 megawatts Kafue Gorge Lower Power Station, in what is known as cascaded generation.

History
Construction of this power station started in 1967. In 1971, the first 150 megawatt turbine was installed and commissioned. Three other turbines were installed and commissioned in 1972. At some point between 1973 and 2009, two more turbines of 150 megawatts each, were installed to bring the generating capacity at the power station to 900 megawatts.

The station currently has an installed capacity of 990 MW with six (6) generators with a capacity of 165 MW each. The power plant has a 330 kV power line output.

References

External links

 Official Website of ZESCO

Power stations in Zambia
Kafue River
Kafue District
Underground power stations
Energy infrastructure completed in 1973
Hydroelectric power stations in Zambia